Louis Trinca-Pasat (born September 7, 1991) is a former American football defensive end. He played college football at Iowa.

Early years
Trinca-Pasat attended Lane Technical College Prep High School in Chicago, where he was a four-sport athlete, lettering in football, basketball, track, and volleyball. He was an All-conference and  Academic All-state selection during his time there. He did not start playing tackle until his freshman year of college and previously played tight end, linebacker, and wide receiver.

Pasat was also a team captain as a senior and earned team MVP honors. He helped Lane to the 2008 Chicago Public League football championship with former teammate Laken Tomlinson. He was named MVP in CPS football.

Regarded as a three-star recruit by Rivals.com, Pasat was listed as the No. 45 defensive end prospect in the class of 2010. He had over 20 full-ride scholarship offers from across the country. He chose to play for the Iowa Hawkeyes over his other top choices from Wisconsin, Michigan State, and Stanford.

College career
He was redshirted as a true freshman at the University of Iowa in 2010. As a redshirt freshman in 2011, Trinca-Pasat didn't get much playing time due to the fact he was still developing and improving his technique. Trinca-Pasat notched 40 tackles as sophomore in 2012. He has started all 38 games over the past three seasons. He has recorded a career-best 69 tackles in 2014, including 11.5 tackles for loss and 6.5 sacks as a redshirt senior. He was named honorable mention All-Big Ten in 2013 and earned 2nd Team All-Big Ten in 2014. He also earned Academic All-Big Ten honors in 2012, 2013, and 2014.

Professional career
On May 4, 2015, Trinca-Pasat signed with the St. Louis Rams as an undrafted free agent following the 2015 NFL Draft. He was released by the Rams on September 5, 2015 and was signed to the practice squad the next day.

On June 9, 2016, Trinca-Pasat was placed on injured reserve after tearing his ACL, causing him to miss the 2016 season.

On September 3, 2017, Trinca-Pasat was waived by the Rams and signed to the practice squad the next day.

Personal life
Trinca-Pasat is a first-generation Romanian-American born in Chicago, Illinois. His parents, Vasile and Estera, escaped communist-ruled Romania in the late 1980s.

References

External links
Iowa Hawkeyes bio

1991 births
Living people
American people of Romanian descent
Players of American football from Chicago
American football defensive tackles
Iowa Hawkeyes football players
St. Louis Rams players
Los Angeles Rams players